Overman is a surname. Notable people with the surname include:

Albert H. Overman (1850–1930), American bicycle manufacturer and founder of Overman Wheel Company
Ion Overman, American actress
Howard Overman, British screenwriter
Larry E. Overman, American chemist
Lee Slater Overman, former U.S. senator